Hiroyoshi (written: 広吉, 広好, 広義, 啓義, 裕義 or 博義) is a masculine Japanese given name. Notable people with the name include:

 (1897–1938), Japanese prince and Imperial Japanese Navy officer
 (born 1971), Japanese footballer
 (born 1948), Japanese politician
 (1920–1944), Japanese World War II flying ace
 (born 1936), Japanese botanist
Hiroyoshi Sasakawa (born 1966), Japanese politician and businessman
 (born 1974), Japanese football referee
 (born 1971), Japanese professional wrestler

Japanese masculine given names